Viktoriya Yuriïvna Shaimardanova (Вікторія Юріївна Шаймарданова; born ) is a Ukrainian weightlifter, competing in the +75 kg category and representing Ukraine at international competitions. 

She participated at the 2000 Summer Olympics in the +75 kg event. 
She competed at world championships, most recently at the 2003 World Weightlifting Championships.

Major results

References

External links

http://www.iwf.net/results/athletes/?athlete=shaimardanova-victoria-1973-10-11&id=636
http://www.alamy.com/stock-photo-victoria-shaymardanova-from-ukraine-competes-during-the-womens-kg-120219683.html
http://www.todor66.com/weightlifting/World/1998/Women_over_75kg.html

1973 births
Living people
Ukrainian female weightlifters
Weightlifters at the 2004 Summer Olympics
Olympic weightlifters of Ukraine
Place of birth missing (living people)
20th-century Ukrainian women
21st-century Ukrainian women